Robert Tyson (born September 29, 1940) is an American former politician who served for two terms in the Kansas State Senate, representing the 12th Senate district from 1997 to 2004. 

Born in Ottawa, Kansas, Tyson worked as a rancher in addition to his time in the Senate. He was the chair of Bob Dole's first U.S. Senate campaign in 1968.

References

Republican Party Kansas state senators
20th-century American politicians
21st-century American politicians
People from Linn County, Kansas
Ottawa University alumni
1940 births
Living people